The TI-12 Math Explorer is an educational calculator designed particularly for students in grades 3–5.  The Math Explorer slotted above the TI-7 MathMate by offering fraction and exponent capabilities, as well as a pi button.

The Math Explorer has since been discontinued and was replaced by the two-line TI-15 Explorer.

Texas Instruments calculators